Donga is a 1985 Indian Telugu-language action film directed by A. Kodandarami Reddy and produced by T. Trivikrama Rao under his banner Vijayalakshmi Art Pictures. The film stars Chiranjeevi and Radha while Rao Gopal Rao, Allu Ramalingaiah and Gollapudi Maruti Rao play the supporting roles with music composed by Chakravarthy. Released on 14 March 1985, the film was a commercial success. Tamil dubbed version is titled  Kolai Karan.

Plot 
Phani (Chiranjeevi) commits thefts just to help the poor. He loves Kodandaramayya's daughter Manju Latha (Radha), but he seeks revenge against Kodandaramayya (Rao Gopala Rao) for killing his father. He also wants his sister Malathi (Rajyalakshmi) to marry Rajesh (Raja), son of Anjaneyulu, but he needs  for her dowry. At the same time, Vishwanatham (Sridhar), an income tax officer, wants his sister Rekha to marry Rajesh. With the help of the police, Phani succeeds in liquidating Kodandaramayya's gang and has his revenge. He also acquires enough money to arrange his sister's marriage with Rajesh.

Cast 

Chiranjeevi as Phani
Radha as Manjulatha
Rao Gopal Rao as Kodandaramayya
Allu Ramalingaiah as Rama Subbaiah
Gollapudi Maruthi Rao as Anjineelu
Rajendra Prasad as Inspector Ravi
Nutan Prasad as Ranga
Sridhar as Viswanath
Raja as Rajesh
P. L. Narayana as Chandra Shekar Rao
Chalapathi Rao
Bheemiswara Rao
Chitti Babu
Silk Smitha
Rajyalakshmi as Malathi
Poornima
Shubha
Mamatha
Athili Lakshmi
Jhansi as Duragamma

Soundtrack 
Music composed by Chakravarthy. Lyrics were written by Veturi. The music released on AVM Audio Company.

Reception 
Giddaluri Gopalrao reviewing for Zamin Ryot on 22 March 1985, has criticised the film for its poorly-written screenplay and needless action sequences while mentioning that Chiranjeevi was the only sigh of relief.

C. S. V of Andhra Patrika writing his review on 29 March 1985, appreciated the performances of the lead cast and Chakravathy's music.

Legacy 

  The film's musical number Golimar has choreography and elements heavily inspired from the music video for Michael Jackson's song "Thriller." The sequence which is often referred as "Indian Thriller", became a viral video; a further parody of the scene by Mike Sutton (Buffalax) titled "Indian Thriller with English lyrics" added subtitles to the video phonetically approximating the original lyrics as English sentences; resulting in "Golimar" being misinterpreted as "Girly man", and producing such lines as "Nippley man I met, he ate my motorboat!", "I'll eat wasabi on my dude", and "You'll be pumping Ovaltine." He has also produced similar spoofs with other songs, including "Benny Lava", a similar edit of a number from the Tamil film Pennin Manathai Thottu.
 American dubstep producer Skrillex sampled "Golimar" in a mashup with his song "Scary Monsters and Nice Sprites" entitled "Scary Bolly Dub"—which includes clips of the scene as visuals during live performances.
 The film's titled has been adopted to the Telugu dubbed version of Tamil film Thambi (2019) starring Karthi.

See also 
 Kasam Paida Karne Wale Ki is a 1984 Bollywood film which also parodies Michael Jackson's "Thriller" music video.

References

External links 
 

1980s Telugu-language films
1985 action films
1985 films
Cultural depictions of Michael Jackson
Films directed by A. Kodandarami Reddy
Films scored by K. Chakravarthy
Indian action films